Rafael Luiz Santos Radwan da Costa  (born 9 May 2002), known as Rafael Luiz or just Rafael, is a Brazilian professional footballer who plays as an right-back for São Paulo Futebol Clube, on loan from Ferroviária.

Career statistics

Club

References

2002 births
Living people
Brazilian footballers
Brazil youth international footballers
Association football defenders
Campeonato Brasileiro Série A players
Campeonato Brasileiro Série B players
Sport Club do Recife players
Cruzeiro Esporte Clube players
Associação Ferroviária de Esportes players
Red Bull Bragantino players
Footballers from Rio de Janeiro (city)